Robert Leighton (5 June 185811 May 1934) was a Scottish journalist, editor, and author of boys' fiction. He was an editor of juvenile magazines, and through his work at Young Folks he met his future wife Marie Connor, a prolific author in her own right. Leighton became an expert on dogs and their care and produced many works on this topic.

Early life
Leighton was born in the town of Ayr in Scotland on 5 June 1858 to Robert Leighton, a Scottish poet (20 February 182210 May 1869), and Elizabeth Jane Campbell (18201914). Some sources, such as the British Library give his year of birth as 1859. Others, including Sutherland, give it at 1858. However, his father only worked in Ayr from 1854 to 1858 for a Liverpool seed merchant, and the only male Leighton born in the District of Ayr from 1854 to 1864 was an unnamed son to Leighton's parents on 5 June 1858.

In the 1861 Census, Leighton was living in Liverpool, where his father was employed by a seed and agricultural supplies merchant. He was educated in the school attached to the Hope Street Unitarian Chapel in Liverpool. He began work as a journalist at age 14, working first for the Liverpool Porcupine, a social and satirical journal.

Moving to London
Leighton moved to London in 1879 and began working for Young Folks magazine as an assistant editor. Young Folks accepted Treasure Island from Robert Louis Stevenson and ran it as a serial from 1881 to1882 while he was first assistant editor. Young Folks also serialised The Black Arrow in JuneOctober 1883. Leighton was the editor from 1884 to 1885.

While he was at Young Folks, he met the tempestuous Marie Connor (February 186628 January 1941), the adopted daughter of James Nenon Alexander Connor, formerly a captain in the 87th Foot, and the daughter of Elizabeth Ann Harris (184916 April 1908), a widow, born Trelawny. Connor, who contributed to the magazine, published her first novel Beauty's Queen, a three-volume melodrama, in 1884 when she was 18. In 1886 Leighton left Little Folks to move to the Bristol Observer, but returned to London in 1887.

In London, he eventually found work with the Harmsworths, and was a director of their Answers Ltd company from 1893 to 1896.

Marriage and family
In 1889, Leighton eloped with Marie Connor; they were married at Marylebone in the first quarter of 1889. Marie was an established novelist at this stage, publishing her sixth book in the year of her marriage.

Leighton began to produce books himself, starting with The Pilots of Pomona in 1892, but throughout the marriage, his wife's income from writing far exceeded his. Leighton was the literary editor of the Daily Mail from 1896 to 1899.

The Leightons had four children:
Their first child was accidentally smothered in infancy by a nurse.
Roland Aubrey Leighton (27 March 189523 December 1915), a poet who was killed in the First World War. He was Vera Brittain's fiancé and features largely in Testament of Youth, the first instalment of her memoirs. He was his mother's favourite. "He is the only one of my children who is beautiful enough to be worth dressing" her daughter reports her as saying. Marie was devastated when Roland was killed and published an anonymous memoir of him as Boy of My Heart in 1916.
Clare Leighton (12 April 18984 November 1989), a writer and artist. She wrote several novels as well as the biography of her mother, and was a noted wood engraver. Marie was dismissive of her looks, ambitions and talents.
Evelyn Ivor Robert Leighton (31 May 190121 October 1969) was destined from boyhood for the Navy. He enjoyed a long naval career, being posted to the Royal Australian Navy for a while, and married an English bride while he was there.

Leighton's day-to-day influence on the household was limited by his deafness. He was so deaf by the time his children were growing up, that he was able to write his adventure books sitting next to his wife while she dictated her next melodrama. Leighton was older and wiser than Marie, and helped Clare's artistic development. His daughter recalls that Leighton adored his wife and that he had something of a cherishing paternal attitude towards her.

Work
Leighton produced four types of output:
Adventure stories for boys.
Melodramas written together with his wife, the most famous being Convict 99 (1898).
Books about dogs starting with Cassell's two-volume New Book of the Dog in 1907.
Short stories and serials for boys' papers.

In a memoir, Larry McMurtry (American novelist, essayist, bookseller and screenwriter) said Leighton's Sergeant Silk: the prairie scout  (about a fictional member of the Royal Canadian Mounted Police), was one of the first books McMurtry ever read. He had been given it by a young relative departing to fight in World War II.

One enormous job Leighton did undertake was the editing of Hall Caine's Life of Christ. When he began this work, the book had some three-million words. Leighton managed to reduce this to some 750,000 before his death in 1934. It was eventually published in 1938, but Leighton's contribution was not mentioned by Caine's sons in their introduction to the work.

Example of illustrations from a historical novel by Leighton

The following illustrations by Alfred Pearse (18561933) for The Thirsty Sword – a story of the Norse invasion of Scotland (1262–1263) give an idea of the pacing of Leighton's writing in a novel which was meant to teach history as well as entertain.

List of long works
The following is a list, drawn from the Jisc Library Hub Discover collated catalogue.

Further details on long works. The columns PG, IA, HT, and BL indicate if online texts are available at:
PG Project Gutenberg
IA The Internet Archive
HT The Hathi Trust
BL The British Library

Example of illustrations from an adventure story by Leighton
While still set in a historical tale, The Golden Galleon was more of an adventure story than a history lesson. It was illustrated by William Rainey.

Shorter works
Leighton published both short stories and serials in publications such as Cheer, Boys, Cheer, Boys Realm, Boys Herald, Comic Cuts, Chums, and Scout.

Death
Leighton died age 75 in Bishop's Stortford, Hertfordshire on 11 May 1934. He was survived by his widow, daughter and a son. His estate was valued at only £286.

Notes

References

External links

Books by Robert Leighton in the British Library Catalogue
Books by Robert Leighton in the Jisc Discover Library Hub
Books by Robert Leighton at Hathi Trust
Books by Robert Leighton on the Internet Archive

1858 births
1934 deaths
People from Ayr
Scottish historical novelists
Scottish children's writers
Writers of historical fiction set in the Middle Ages
Writers of historical fiction set in the early modern period